John Geoghegan (5 November 1913 – 5 January 1975) was an Irish Fianna Fáil politician who served as a Teachta Dála (TD) for more than twenty years.

Geoghegan was elected to Dáil Éireann on his first attempt, at the 1954 general election, taking his seat in the 15th Dáil as TD for the Galway West constituency.

He was re-elected at the next five general elections. In July 1969, he was appointed by Taoiseach Jack Lynch as Parliamentary Secretary to the Minister for Social Welfare. He served until Fianna Fáil lost office at the 1973 general election.

After his death on 5 January 1975, the by-election for his Galway West seat in the 20th Dáil was held on 4 March and won for Fianna Fáil by his daughter Máire Geoghegan-Quinn.

See also
Families in the Oireachtas

References

 

1913 births
1975 deaths
Fianna Fáil TDs
Members of the 15th Dáil
Members of the 16th Dáil
Members of the 17th Dáil
Members of the 18th Dáil
Members of the 19th Dáil
Members of the 20th Dáil
Politicians from County Galway
Parliamentary Secretaries of the 19th Dáil